Vijaya Bhaskar (1924–2002) was an Indian music director and composer who composed music for several mainstream and experimental feature films in the Kannada film industry. Scoring music for over 600 feature films, Bhaskar worked in Tamil, Telugu, Malayalam, Marathi, Tulu and Konkani language films as well. He was a part of all films of director KSL Swamy (Ravi) and also shared a great association with acclaimed directors Puttanna Kanagal and Adoor Gopalakrishnan.

Influenced by R C Boral and Mukul Mehta, Bhaskar developed his own style of music and introduced the concept of theme music in Kannada film industry. He is credited for inspiring producers to select popular works of Kannada poets through his music. He was awarded with the Dr. Rajkumar Award and the prestigious Sur Singar Award from Mumbai music lovers (for his classical score in Malaya Marutha Kannada movie, directed by Ravi). He was also a recipient of Karnataka State Film Award for Best Music Director six times.

Some of Bhaskar's most popular soundtracks include Rani Honnamma, Santha Thukaram, Gejje Pooje, Mana Mechida Madadi, Belli Moda, Naandi, Sharapanjara, Naagarahaavu,  Shubhamangala, Neela and Malaya Marutha.

Vijaya Bhaskar never got a chance to get Rajkumar to sing in his music direction (except for humming a few lines of Doniyolage Neenu in Uyyale) though Santha Thukaram in their combination won a National award. Rajkumar did sing at Vijaya Bhaskar's daughter's function.

Biography

Career
Vijaya Bhaskar was born in Bangalore. Originally from Arcot Mudaliar family. He started his training in Music early in his life. His guru in Hindustani Classical music was Govinda Bhave who taught him the basics. Vijaya Bhaskar also learnt the intricacies of Carnatic Classical music and the piano.

Vijaya Bhaskar was busy in Bombay, assisting music directors like Naushad and Madan Mohan. In Bombay Bhaskar was sitting in a restaurant in Matunga and chatting with a friend and then accidentally met B R Krishnamurthy (BRK). Bhaskar was speaking in Kannada and overheard BRK. BRK used to work as an assistant to R Nagendra Rao and had worked on several pictures with him. Bhaskar told him he was a musician. He asked him whether he would make music for a Kannada picture they were making. Bhaskar finally came down from Bombay in 1953 to do the score for film Sri Rama Puja. He took charge and single-handedly changed the face of Kannada film music. The Kannada film industry got its first original music composer.

Puttanna Kanagal who was assisting BR Pantulu, with Bellimoda became independent Director. VB was the music director for Belli Moda. Film became an instant success and cemented their association. After Belli Moda, there was Gejje Pooje, and later Naagarahaavu. He worked with Kanagal continuously till the '80s and then there was a break when M Ranga Rao took over for films like Ranganayaki. Bhaskar came back for Maanasa Sarovara.

He has scored music for nearly 670 movies.

Style
Influenced by R.C. Boral and Mukul Mehta, Bhaskar developed his own style of music. He also proved that Kannada films too can have theme music. Bhaskar did not limit his musical talent for commercial movies alone. 
According to Vijaya Bhaskar folk music was the forerunner of all existing forms of music in the world. His specialty lay in the fact that he was equally comfortable using a minimum number of instruments as well as a whole orchestra. Vijaya Bhaskar's compositions are melodious and lilting. He was comfortable composing light songs as well as ghazals. He also has quite a few devotional and popular light songs to his credit. His range was extensive and included all genres of music.

He directed music for experimental movies like Grahana, Yellindalo Bandavaru and Naandi. Bhaskar is credited for inspiring producers to select popular works of Kannada poets through his music. Some of the popular numbers include "Moodana Maneya" in Belli Moda (poem by D. R. Bendre) and "Uttara Dhruvadim" in Sharapanjara (also by D. R. Bendre).

Other languages 
Even though Vijaya Bhaskar's first composition was for a Kannada film this prolific composer has composed the music for films in Tamil Telugu Malayalam Konkani Oriya and Tulu. Apart from music composition he has also given background score for several movies. Popular Malayalam director Adoor Gopalakrishnan always preferred Bhaskar for his movies. Gopalakrishnan was very much impressed when Bhaskar gave music for his movie Mathilukal which had no songs at all. All in all Bhaskar gave music for three of Gopalakrishnan's films in Malayalam – Kathapurushan, Vidheyan and Mathilukal. In Hindi Bhaskar did G. V. Iyer's Vivekananda.

His music to Tulu language movie Koti Chennayya(1973) is very popular in Mangalore.

Bhaskar also went to London and did an English film. The film was called Robert Clive, and it was released in India also. It was shot mostly in India, and Bhaskar did a major part of the score.

Death
Vijaya Bhaskar died on the morning of 3 March 2002 following a cardiac arrest at his residence in J. P. Nagar locality of Bangalore. He was 77, and left behind his wife, a son, two daughters and 5 grandchildren. His body was cremated in Wilson gardens crematorium on 5 March.

Awards 
Dr. Rajkumar Award (2001)

Sursingar Prashasthi

Karnataka State Film Award for Best Music Director
 1967–68: Belli Moda
 1971–72: Yaava Janmada Maitri
 1972–73: Sankalpa
 1983–84: Dharani Mandala Madhyadolage
 1989–90: Muraligana Amruthapana
 1991–92: Pathitha Pavani

Discography

Kannada

Tulu
Koti Chennaya (1973)

Tamil

Anbe Deivam (1957)
Engamma Sapatham (1974)
Unga Veetu Kalyanam (1975)
Yarukku Maappillai Yaro (1975)
Thottadhellam Ponnaagum (1975)
Mogam Muppadhu Varusham (1976)
Mayangukiral Oru Maadhu (1975)
Aadu Puli Aattam (1977)
Avar Enakke Sontham (1977)
Thappu Thalangal (1978)
Soundaryame Varuga Varuga (1980)

Telugu
Krishnaveni (1974)
Ammaila Sapadham (1975)

Malayalam
Mathilukal (1990)
Vidheyan (1994)
Pathirappattu  (1967)

See also
M. Ranga Rao
T. G. Lingappa
G. K. Venkatesh
Rajan–Nagendra

References

1924 births
2002 deaths
Kannada film score composers
Telugu film score composers
Musicians from Bangalore
Tamil film score composers
Malayalam film score composers
20th-century Indian musicians
University Visvesvaraya College of Engineering alumni